Plaza del Sol is an  regional mall located in the city of Bayamón, Puerto Rico. Plaza del Sol is anchored by Caribbean Cinemas, Walmart, H&M, Dave & Buster's and Home Depot. The mall was opened in 1998; it was later acquired  in 2005 by DDR Corp. from a $1.15 billion portfolio deal with Caribbean Property Group (CPG) which included the mall.

In 2017 DDR Corp. spun off its Puerto Rican shopping centers to RVI (Retail Value Inc.) due to struggles they had after the Hurricane Maria, making Retail Value Inc. the new owner of the mall at the time.

In August 2021 Developers Diversified (DDR Corp.) came back to the PR retail landscape with a $550 million deal with RVI which Plaza del Sol was included in, making DDR the owner of the mall once again.

On September 15, 2022, it was announced that Bed Bath & Beyond would be closing as part of a plan to close 150 stores nationwide.
 
Outparcels are Pep Boys, Oriental Bank and Farmacias Plaza.

Renovations
In 2011 after the acquisition from DDR Corp. It was announced that during the next 6 years they would be redeveloping the mall to add more retail space and also to change the design it was given since it was first built. The mall added , moving the food court upstairs and reusing the space below for new tenants. Phase two of Plaza Del Sol's redevelopment will include more parking spaces and the construction of approximately 137,000 square feet of new GLA to accommodate the expansion of a key anchor as well as construction of additional junior anchor boxes.

Anchor Stores
Walmart
Caribbean Cinemas
H&M
Old Navy
Dave & Buster's
Home Depot

Gallery

References

External links
 http://www.ddr.com/properties/20072
 http://rvipuertorico.com/centros/plaza-del-sol/
 http://rvipuertorico.com

Buildings and structures in Bayamón, Puerto Rico
Shopping malls in Puerto Rico
Shopping malls established in 1998